Pannarat Thanapolboonyaras (born 29 December 1997) is a Thai professional golfer playing on the LPGA Tour.

Professional career 
Thanapolboonyaras turned professional in 2015. In December 2015, she finished tied for 15th place at the final stage LPGA Qualifying Tournament to earn LPGA Membership for the 2016 season. On the 2016 LPGA Tour, she was the youngest player on the tour. She played 18 events and made seven cuts. She recorded a career-best finish on the LPGA Tour at the Manulife LPGA Classic in Ontario, Canada with a tied for 22nd place.

On 23 September 2016, Thanapolboonyaras claimed her first ALPG Tour win at the Thailand LPGA Masters which was co-sanctioned by the Thai LPGA Tour. In 2017, she was on the top of the Ladies Asian Golf Tour money list.

In 2018, Thanapolboonyaras played 23 events on the LPGA Tour and made nine cuts. She recorded the first top-10 finish of her LPGA Tour career at the Blue Bay LPGA in China where she tied for 10th place.

Amateur wins 
2011 Singha Junior World Championship
2012 Singha Thailand Junior World
2013 TGA-Singha Junior Ranking 2

Source:

Professional wins (2)

ALPG Tour wins (1) 
2016 Thailand LPGA Masters^

^ Co-sanctioned by the Thai LPGA Tour

All Thailand Golf Tour wins (1)
2015 Singha E-San Open (as an amateur)

 Results in LPGA majors Results not in chronological order before 2019''

CUT = missed the half-way cut
NT = no tournament
"T" = tied

Team appearances
Amateur
Espirito Santo Trophy (representing Thailand): 2014

Professional
Amata Friendship Cup (representing Thailand): 2018 (winners)

References

External links 
 
 

Pannarat Thanapolboonyaras
LPGA Tour golfers
Pannarat Thanapolboonyaras
1997 births
Living people
Pannarat Thanapolboonyaras